Dinoflagellate Blooms is the fourth studio album that J. G. Thirlwell has issued under the pseudonym Manorexia. It was released on June 11, 2011 by Ectopic Ents. The Wire gave the record a glowing review, saying "it's a hugely satisfying record, representing half a decade of concentrated work but also a fine unity of purpose."

Track listing

Personnel 
Heung-Heung Chin – art direction
Scott Hull – mastering
J. G. Thirlwell – instruments, producer, design

Release history

References

External links
 Dinoflagellate Blooms at foetus.org

2011 albums
Albums produced by JG Thirlwell
Manorexia albums